Frederick Voris Follmer (December 13, 1885 – May 3, 1971) was a United States district judge of the United States District Court for the Eastern District of Pennsylvania, the United States District Court for the Middle District of Pennsylvania and the United States District Court for the Western District of Pennsylvania.

Education and career

Born in Milton, Pennsylvania, Follmer received an Artium Baccalaureus degree from Bucknell University in 1906 and a Bachelor of Laws from Harvard Law School in 1909. In private practice in Pennsylvania from 1910 to 1935, he also served as an assistant district attorney of Northumberland County, Pennsylvania from 1911 to 1914. He was the United States Attorney for the Middle District of Pennsylvania from 1935 to 1946.

Federal judicial service

Follmer was nominated by President Harry S. Truman on July 31, 1946, to the United States District Court for the Eastern District of Pennsylvania, the United States District Court for the Middle District of Pennsylvania and the United States District Court for the Western District of Pennsylvania, to a new joint seat authorized by 60 Stat. 654. He was confirmed by the United States Senate on July 31, 1946, and received his commission on August 7, 1946. His service in the Eastern District and Western District terminated on June 1, 1955, due to reassignment by operation of law. He served as Chief Judge of the Middle District in 1962. He assumed senior status on December 30, 1967. His service terminated on May 3, 1971, due to his death.

References

Sources
 

1885 births
1971 deaths
Bucknell University alumni
Harvard Law School alumni
Judges of the United States District Court for the Western District of Pennsylvania
Judges of the United States District Court for the Middle District of Pennsylvania
Judges of the United States District Court for the Eastern District of Pennsylvania
United States district court judges appointed by Harry S. Truman
20th-century American judges
United States Attorneys for the Middle District of Pennsylvania